The 2009 FIM Speedway World Championship Grand Prix of Scandinavia was the 6th race of the 2009 Speedway Grand Prix season. It took place on 15 August in the G&B Stadium in Målilla, Sweden.

The Grand Prix was won by Pole Tomasz Gollob who beat Jason Crump, Hans N. Andersen and Kenneth Bjerre in the final. It was first GP winning in this season for Gollob.

Riders 

The Speedway Grand Prix Commission nominated Antonio Lindbäck as a Wild Card, and Simon Gustafsson and Ludvig Lindgren, both as Track Reserve. The riders' starting positions draw for Grand Prix meeting was made on 14 August by Ilkka Teromaa, FIM Jury President.

Heat details

Heat after heat 
 Lindbäck, Lindgren, Nicholls, Holta (R4)
 Harris, Sayfutdinov, Hancock, Ułamek
 Jonsson, Walasek, Pedersen, Adams
 Gollob, Bjerre, Crump, Andersen
 Crump, Harris, Lindbäck, Walasek (R4)
 Andersen, Jonsson, Nicholls, Ułamek
 Pedersen, Gollob, Sayfutdinov, Lindgren
 Bjerre, Holta, Hancock, Adams
 Ułamek, Pedersen, Lindbäck, Bjerre (R4)
 Adams, Gollob, Harris, Nicholls
 Hancock, Lindgren, Andersen, Walasek (R4)
 Jonsson, Crump, Sayfutdinov, Holta
 Andersen, Lindbäck, Adams, Sayfutdinov(F2x)
 Crump, Hancock, Nicholls, Pedersen
 Bjerre, Jonsson, Lindgren, Harris
 Gollob, Ułamek, Walasek, Holta
 Gollob, Lindbäck, Hancock, Jonsson
 Walasek, Nicholls, Sayfutdinov, Bjerre
 Lindgren, Crump, Adams, Ułamek
 Andersen, Harris, Pedersen, Holta
 Semi-Finals:
 Gollob, Bjerre, Lindgren, Jonsson
 Crump, Andersen, Lindbäck, Harris
 The Final:
 Gollob (6 pts), Crump (4 pts), Andersen (2 pts), Bjerre (0 pts)

The intermediate classification

See also 
 Speedway Grand Prix
 List of Speedway Grand Prix riders

References

External links 
 FIM-live.com 

Sc
2009
2009 in Swedish motorsport